Gaoping is a small town in the mountains near Zunyi, in Guizhou (Kweichow) province, People's Republic of China.

It is near the Moutai brewery, where Maotai rice liquor is brewed.

Lai fun, a variety of rice noodle is made locally.

The rice liquor Dongjiu is brewed nearby. The local beer Gaoyuan is said to be quite delicious.
It is said that the local mountain water accounts for the quality of these locally brewed beverages.

References 

Geography of Guizhou